The 1954–55 Greek Football Cup was the 13th edition of the Greek Football Cup. The competition culminated with the Greek Cup Final, held at Leoforos Alexandras Stadium, on 12 June 1955. The match was contested by Panathinaikos and PAOK, with Panathinaikos winning by 2–0.

Calendar
From Round of 16 onwards:

Knockout phase
In the knockout phase, teams play against each other over a single match. If the match ends up as a draw, extra time will be played and if the match remains a draw a replay match is set at the home of the guest team which the extra time rule stands as well. If a winner doesn't occur after the replay match the winner emerges by a flip of a coin. The mechanism of the draws for each round is as follows:
In the draw for the round of 16, the eight top teams of each association are seeded and the eight clubs that passed the qualification round are unseeded.The seeded teams are drawn against the unseeded teams.
In the draws for the quarter-finals onwards, there are no seedings, and teams from the same group can be drawn against each other.

Bracket

Round of 16

||colspan="2" rowspan="2" 

||colspan="2" rowspan="3" 

||colspan="2" 
|}
* Match suspended at 69th minute. Olympiacos scored and Olympiacos Patras players questioned goal's validity and left from the field.

Quarter-finals

|}

Semi-finals

|}

Final

The 13th Greek Cup Final was played at the Leoforos Alexandras Stadium.

References

External links
Greek Cup 1954-55 at RSSSF

Greek Football Cup seasons
Greek Cup
Cup